Alexey Dmitrovich Nalobin (born 3 October 1989) is a Russian volleyball player, a member of Polish club Dafi Społem Kielce.

Career
In 2016 he achieved silver medal of German Championship with VfB Friedrichshafen. In season 2016/17 he was a player of Russian club Dinamo Krasnodar, but due to financial problem of club, Nalobin decided to leave the team in January 2017. On January 31, 2017 he went to Polish team Dafi Społem Kielce and signed contract to the end of season 2017/18.

Sporting achievements

Clubs

National championships
 2015/2016  German Championship, with VfB Friedrichshafen

References

1989 births
Living people
Russian men's volleyball players
Russian expatriate sportspeople in Germany
Expatriate volleyball players in Germany
Russian expatriates in Poland
Expatriate volleyball players in Poland
Effector Kielce players
20th-century Russian people
21st-century Russian people